The Federation of Malaya competed at the 1962 British Empire and Commonwealth Games in Perth, Western Australia, from 22 November to 1 December 1962.

Medalists

Athletics

Men
Track events

Key
Note–Ranks given for track events are within the athlete's heat only
N/A = Round not applicable for the event

Cycling

Road

Track
Sprint

Time trial

Pursuit

Scratch race

Swimming

Men

Weightlifting

Men

References

1962
Nations at the 1962 British Empire and Commonwealth Games
1962 in Malayan sport